Yannakakis is a family name of Greek origin. It may refer to one of the following persons.

Mihalis Yannakakis (born 1953), Greek computer scientist
Georgios N. Yannakakis, Greek computer scientist working in Denmark
Ilios Yannakakis (1931-2017), French-Greek historian and politologist

Greek-language surnames
Surnames